is a Japanese light novel series written by Kotoko Ayano, with illustrations by Chinatsu Morimoto. The first novel won a Special Judge Award in the Kyoto Animation Award competition in 2016, and was published by the studio in December of that year.

An anime television series adaptation, produced by Kyoto Animation, aired from October 2018 to January 2019. An anime film premiered in August 2022. A second season premiered in January 2023.

Plot
Minato Narumiya used to be in his middle school's kyūdō club until a certain incident in his last tournament caused him to resolve to quit archery for good. When he attends high school, his childhood friends Seiya Takehaya and Ryōhei Yamanouchi try to rope him into joining the high school's kyūdō club again, but he refuses. However, an encounter with a mysterious man at an archery range in a forest inspires Minato to take up archery once more. Minato joins the Kazemai High School Kyūdō Club and along with his old friends and new teammates, Nanao Kisaragi and Kaito Onogi, they aim for winning the prefectural tournament.

Characters

Kazemai High School Archery Club

Minato is a first-year student. He is childhood friends with Seiya and Ryohei. A teammate of Shu and Seiya in Middle School. He's in the boys team of kyūdō. He and Shu had the same archery teacher before going to the same middle school. His mother died in an accident that also injured him, and he now performs many domestic chores at his home, such as cooking meals. He lives across the street from Seiya. He begins the series with target panic, which in his case manifests as a tendency to loose his arrow too quickly and miss the target.

Seiya is a first-year student. He is childhood friends with Minato and Ryohei. A teammate of Shu and Minato in middle school. He's also the club head and captain of the boys' team. Seiya is intelligent, first in his class at Kazemai, and while he doesn't like to talk about himself he obviously highly values his relationship with Minato even to the extent of leaving the more prestigious Kirisaki school system to follow him to Kazemai, wanting to convince him to restart Kyudo.

Ryohei is a first-year student. He is Minato and Seiya's childhood friend. He went to a different middle school as his friends, but met back up in high school. He's in the boys team of kyūdō. He is a relative novice, having begun kyūdō late in middle school after seeing Minato in a match.

Nanao is a first-year student. He is also Kaito's cousin. He's in the boys team of kyūdō. He is cheerful and seemingly superficial and has many female admirers.

Kaito is a first-year student. He is also Nanao's cousin. He's in the boys team of kyūdō. He takes kyūdō very seriously and is highly critical of those that he thinks do not. Many first year beginners in the club cited their fear of him as a reason they quit the club.

Rika is a first-year student. She is the captain of the girls' team. The other girls greatly admire her.

Noa is a first-year student. She's in the girls team of kyūdō.

Yuna is a first-year student. She's in the girls team of kyūdō.

Tomio, also called Tommy-sensei or the Oni Archer, is the teacher who acts as the Kyūdō Club advisor. He holds a 6-dan rank in kyūdō but his back often goes out soon after he shoots.

Masaki is a Senior Shrine Priest at Yuta Shrine, later becomes the coach for the Kyūdō Club. He holds a 5-dan rank in kyūdō. At one point he, like Minato, had target panic and temporarily lost his ability to shoot properly.

Kirisaki High School Archery Club

Shu is a first-year Student, also the former teammate of Minato and Seiya in middle school. He and Minato had the same archery teacher before going to the same middle school. Stoic and solitary, he values his rivalry with Minato but considers motivations unlike his own to be unworthy.

Daigo is a third-year student. He's also the vice-captain of the Kyūdō Club.

Senichi is a first-year student. He is the identical twin to Manji, who is in the same club. Seemingly interchangeable with his brother, they viciously mock competitors and look down on those they don't see as talented. They both use an unusually quick release style but remain highly accurate archers.

Manji is a first-year student. He is the identical twin to Senichi, who is in the same club. Seemingly interchangeable with his brother, they viciously mock competitors and look down on those they don't see as talented. They both use an unusually quick release style but remain highly accurate archers.

Hiroki is a third-year student who is the captain of the Kyūdō Club.

Tsujimine High School Archery Club

Media

Light novels

|}

Anime
An anime television series adaptation was originally scheduled to premiere on October 15, but due to organizational issues, the series premiered from October 22, 2018 to January 21, 2019 on NHK. The series was produced by Kyoto Animation and was directed by Takuya Yamamura, with Michiko Yokote handling the series' scripts, and Miku Kadowaki designing the characters. Harumi Fūki composed the series' music. The series is simulcast by Crunchyroll. Sentai Filmworks has acquired the series for distribution in North America, Australasia, South America, and other territories. An unaired 14th episode was screened at an event on March 3, 2019 and released with the first Blu-ray/DVD on May 1, 2019, with Crunchyroll later releasing it in English.

On October 22, 2020, it was revealed that the series would be receiving a new anime film project. Titled , the film premiered in Japan on August 19, 2022. Most of the main staff reprised their roles from the television anime. Takuya Yamamura also handled the scripts with supervision from Michiko Yokote, while Masaru Yokoyama replaced Harumi Fūki as the film's composer. At Anime NYC 2022, Sentai Filmworks announced that they will screen the film in theaters in 2023.

On the day of the film's premiere, it was announced that the series would be receiving a second season, subtitled , with Yamamura returning as director. It premiered on January 5, 2023.

Notes

References

External links
  
  
 

2016 Japanese novels
Anime and manga based on light novels
Crunchyroll anime
Films about archery
KA Esuma Bunko
Kyoto Animation
Light novels
NHK original programming
Sentai Filmworks
Sports anime and manga
Television series about archery
Television shows based on light novels
Tokyo MX original programming